Euriphene atrovirens, the black nymph, is a butterfly in the family Nymphalidae. It is found in Nigeria, Cameroon, Gabon, the Republic of the Congo and the Democratic Republic of the Congo. The habitat consists of forests.

The larvae feed on Oubanguia species.

References

Butterflies described in 1878
Euriphene
Butterflies of Africa
Taxa named by Paul Mabille